is the twelfth single by Do As Infinity, released in 2002. It was used as the theme song for the drama Hatsutaiken.

This song was included in the band's compilation album Do the A-side.

Track listing
 
 "What You Gonna Do?"
  (Instrumental)
 "What You Gonna Do?" (Instrumental)

Chart positions

References

External links
 "Hi no Ataru Sakamichi" at Avex Network
 "Hi no Ataru Sakamichi" at Oricon

2002 singles
Do As Infinity songs
Songs written by Dai Nagao
Japanese television drama theme songs
Song recordings produced by Seiji Kameda
2002 songs